Mariano Alejandro Campodónico (born 4 May 1974) is a retired Argentine footballer who played as a forward and current manager. He is the brother of former footballer Pablo Campodónico.

Career
Campodónico started his career in 1994, his first club was Banfield, he remained with them for four years before joining Platense with whom he made 17 appearances. 1999 saw Campodónico leave Platense and complete a move to San Martín (SJ) before subsequently agreeing to join Arsenal de Sarandí in 2000 and El Porvenir in 2001. In 2002, Campodónico moved out of Argentina for the first-team as he agreed to sign for Venezuelan Primera División club Caracas, however his spell with Caracas was short as he soon departed to join Ecuadorian Serie A side Aucas.

One year later he left to join fellow Ecuadorian team Deportivo Quito. Moves to Gimnasia, Chiapas, Ferro Carril Oeste and Belgrano followed between 2003 and 2007. In 2004, Campodónico, playing for Ferro Carril Oeste scored twice against Sarmiento. Sarmiento's goalkeeper was Campodónico's own brother, Pablo. Mariano told reporters that "this was the worst thing that's happened to me in my football career". In 2006, while playing for Belgrano, Campodónico was sentenced to eight days in prison for making "obscene gestures" at the opposing team during a football game.

He joined Nueva Chicago in 2007 and made 12 appearances before leaving not long after joining to complete a transfer to San Martín (T). 6 goals in 10 appearances followed for San Martín (T) before Campodónico moved to Paraguay to play for Cerro Porteño. He was with Cerro Porteño for one season, 2008, before eventually joining Aldosivi, which meant he was at the same team as his brother, Pablo, for the first-time. After leaving Aldosivi, he joined All Boys before then moving to Belgrano (second spell), Temperley and Talleres. Campodónico played for Mitre in 2015 and Cañuelas in 2016 before announcing his retirement.

Coaching career
Retiring in the summer 2017, Campodónico began his coaching career at his last club as a player, Cañuelas, where he was appointed manager on 28 December 2017. However, he decided to resign on 19 June 2018.

A few days after leaving Cañuelas, Campodónico was appointed manager of Club Luján at the end of June 2018. After only two victories, four draws and seven defeats, he was fired 15 October 2018.

On 3 February 2019, Campodónico was appointed manager of Sacachispas FC. He left his position on 16 September 2019.

After Israel Damonte was appointed manager of Huracán on 3 January 2020, Campodónico also joined the club as his assistant coach, alongside his brother, Pablo Campodónico, who was appointed goalkeeper coach. They left in March 2021

Honours

Club
San Martín (T)
 Primera B Nacional (1): 2007–08

References

External links
 
 Statistics at BDFA 

1974 births
Living people
Association football forwards
Argentine footballers
Argentine expatriate footballers
Club Atlético Banfield footballers
Club Atlético Platense footballers
San Martín de San Juan footballers
Arsenal de Sarandí footballers
El Porvenir footballers
Caracas FC players
S.D. Aucas footballers
S.D. Quito footballers
Gimnasia y Esgrima de Jujuy footballers
Chiapas F.C. footballers
Ferro Carril Oeste footballers
Club Atlético Belgrano footballers
Nueva Chicago footballers
San Martín de Tucumán footballers
Cerro Porteño players
Aldosivi footballers
All Boys footballers
Club Atlético Temperley footballers
Talleres de Remedios de Escalada footballers
Talleres de Remedios de Escalada managers
Cañuelas footballers
Argentine Primera División players
Primera Nacional players
Primera B Metropolitana players
Paraguayan Primera División players
Argentine expatriate sportspeople in Ecuador
Argentine expatriate sportspeople in Paraguay
Expatriate footballers in Ecuador
Expatriate footballers in Paraguay
Argentine football managers
People from Adrogué
Sportspeople from Buenos Aires Province